Jonas Björkman and Todd Woodbridge were the defending champions, but Björkman did not compete this year. Woodbridge partnered with Mahesh Bhupathi and successfully defended his title, by defeating Arnaud Clément and Michaël Llodra 6–3, 6–3 in the final.

It was the 37th title for Bhupathi and the 83rd (and final) title for Woodbridge in their respective doubles careers. It was also the 1st title for both players in the season.

Seeds

Draw

Draw

References
 Main Draw

2005 Medibank International
2005 ATP Tour